1. deild karla (English: Men's 1st Division), also known as Grill 66 deild karla for sponsorship reasons, is the second-tier men's handball competition among clubs in Iceland. It is managed by the Icelandic Handball Association. The current champions are Fjölnir.

Past champions

Source

Awards

Player of the Year
2017 - Jón Kristinn Björgvinsson
2018 - Kristófer Dagur Sigurðsson

Young player of the Year
2017 - Sveinn Jóhannsson
2018 - Dagur Gautason

Coach of the Year
2017 - Arnar Gunnarsson
2018 - Sverre Andreas Jakobsson

References

External links 
 Grill 66 deild karla 2017-2018 

Handball leagues in Iceland
Sports leagues established in 1952
1952 establishments in Iceland
Professional sports leagues in Iceland